Black Cat Detective is a Chinese animated television series produced by the Shanghai Animation Film Studio. It is sometimes known as Mr. Black. The main character, Black Cat Detective, was created by Zhu Zhixiang (诸志祥).

Background 
The series was originally aired from 1984 to 1987. In June 2006, a rebroadcasting of the original series was announced. Critics bemoan the series' violence, and lack of suitability for children's education. Proponents of the show claim that it is merely for entertainment. The show's violence far outweighs that of Tom and Jerry, in that there is frequent use of guns, and blood and gore.

Story 

The story takes place in a forest, where the Black Cat Detective wanders around on his motorcycle stopping villains. Cases range from clashing with mice and other characters.

1984 Series 
The first version of Black Cat Detective was created in 1984 produced by the Shanghai Animation Film Studio. It was directed by Dai Tielang (戴铁郎), who also created the designs for the main character, Black Cat Detective. The series consists of five episodes, each of which are 20 minutes in length.

2010 Series 
The digitally restored animated film was released on April 23, 2010, with the general director still Dai Tielang（戴铁郎）. The new movie version is actually a cut from the original 5 episodes of the movie, with dialogue rewritten and dubbed for the times, and the movie theme song sung by Lin Miao Ke(林妙可).

2015 Series Animated films 
Mr. Black: Green Star has been released in theaters on August 7, 2015.

Notes

References

External links 
 Images, clips and stories AsiaObscura.com
 China's Movie Database
 Movie114 Database

1984 Chinese television series debuts
2010 Chinese television series endings
China Central Television original programming
Chinese children's animated science fantasy television series
Shōnen manga
Seinen manga
Gekiga
Animated television series about cats
Detective anime and manga
1980s Chinese television series
1990s Chinese television series
2000s Chinese television series
1980s animated television series
1990s animated television series
2000s animated television series
2010s animated television series
Science fiction anime and manga
Television characters introduced in 1984
Teenage characters in anime and manga
Mandarin-language television shows
Teen fantasy television series